Walid Badir (born 12 March 1974) is an Arab-Israeli former professional footballer who played as a midfielder.

He won four league titles in five seasons with Maccabi Haifa before joining Hapoel Tel Aviv in 2005. He served as their captain, and won a further league title before retiring in 2013. Badir scored 12 goals in 74 games for the Israel national team between 1997 and 2007.

Early life
Badir was born in Kafr Qasim, Israel. to an Arab-Muslim family.

Club career

Early career
Badir was recognized early on as a valuable prospect, and played for the youth clubs Hapoel Kafr Qasim and Hapoel Petah Tikva, and later was given a spot on the second team's  Premier League squad. Badir played for Petach Tikva for seven consecutive seasons (1992–1997) and scored 19 goals.

Wimbledon
During  Badir's time at Wimbledon he scored one league goal against Manchester United at Old Trafford. However, other than this he did not make a major impact in his time with the club, making only 21 team appearances in total.

Maccabi Haifa
Badir returned to Israel to Maccabi Haifa in 2000–01 at the beginning of the Avram Grant era. Grant created one of the most gifted teams in the history of Israeli football. With Badir, Haifa won four championships, failing only once, in 2002–03 when Maccabi Tel Aviv won the title.

Hapoel Tel Aviv
In 2005, while Haifa began a major campaign to revamp the squad with South American players such ad Gustavo Boccoli and Roberto Colautti, Badir signed with Hapoel Tel Aviv. He became a major part of their 2005–06 season when they were runners-up to his former team and State Cup winners. He was awarded the captaincy of the team and held it until his retirement.

On 26 August 2013, in Bloomfield Stadium, the club and its fans made a thankful standing ovation in honour of Badir's last appearance with Hapoel Tel Aviv before formally retiring.

Coaching career
17 November 2012, Badir was appointed as caretaker manager for Hapoel Tel Aviv.

International career
Badir appeared in 74 games with  the Israel national team, and scored 12 goals. His first appearance was on 5 August 1997 in a friendly match against Belarus (3–2).

One of his most notable games was his 83rd-minute goal in Israel's draw against France in a 2006 World Cup qualifying match.

Honours
 Israeli Premier League: 2000–01, 2001–02, 2003–04, 2004–05, 2009–10
 Toto Cup: 2002–03
 Israel State Cup: 2006, 2007, 2010, 2011, 2012

References

External links 

1974 births
Living people
Arab citizens of Israel
Footballers from Kafr Qasim
Arab-Israeli footballers
Israeli footballers
Hapoel Petah Tikva F.C. players
Wimbledon F.C. players
Maccabi Haifa F.C. players
Hapoel Tel Aviv F.C. players
Liga Leumit players
Israeli Premier League players
Premier League players
Israel international footballers
Israeli expatriate footballers
Expatriate footballers in England
Israeli expatriate sportspeople in England
Association football central defenders
Association football midfielders
Hapoel Tel Aviv F.C. managers
Israeli Premier League managers
Israeli Muslims